Nelsonøya (anglicized as Nelson Island) is a small island, part of Sjuøyane, north of Nordaustlandet.

The island is named after the well known englishman Horatio Nelson, who served as midshipman aboard , under Captain Skeffington Lutwidge. The Carcass was one of the two bomb vessels sent under the command of Constantine John Phipps to Svalbard during the 1773 Phipps expedition towards the North Pole.

References

Conway, W. M. 1906. No Man's Land: A History of Spitsbergen from Its Discovery in 1596 to the Beginning of the Scientific Exploration of the Country. Cambridge: At the University Press.
Norwegian Polar Institute: Place names in Norwegian polar areas

Islands of Svalbard